

List of Naval Guns by country of origin in decreasing caliber size

List of naval guns by caliber size, all countries

Naval anti-aircraft guns

See also 
List of artillery
List of the largest cannon by caliber
Glossary of British ordnance terms

References

External links 
NAVWEAPS – Naval weapons of the world, 1880 to today (retrieved 2010-02-01)

 
Naval